Shaakir Abrahams (born 15 April 1994) is a South African cricketer. He made his List A debut for Boland in the 2018–19 CSA Provincial One-Day Challenge on 18 November 2018.

References

External links
 

1994 births
Living people
South African cricketers
Boland cricketers
Place of birth missing (living people)